Jonathan Paul Clayden  (born 6 February 1968) is a Professor of organic chemistry at the University of Bristol.

Education
In 1992 he obtained his PhD at the University of Cambridge working with Dr Stuart Warren on asymmetric synthesis using phosphine oxide chemistry. He then carried out a postdoc with Prof Marc Julia and in 1994 became a lecturer in organic chemistry at the University of Manchester where he became a reader in 2000 and a Professor of Organic Chemistry in 2001. In 2015 he moved to a chair in chemistry at the University of Bristol.

Research
His research interests encompass various areas of synthesis and stereochemistry, particularly where conformation has a role to play: asymmetric synthesis, atropisomerism, organolithium chemistry, remote stereochemical effects and dynamic foldamer chemistry. He is one of the authors of the organic chemistry textbook - Organic Chemistry by Clayden, Greeves, Warren and Wothers. He also wrote Organolithiums: Selectivity for Synthesis, which concerns the use of organolithium compounds in organic synthetic reactions.

From 2005 to 2011 he was editor-in-chief of the Open Access Beilstein Journal of Organic Chemistry.

References

Organic chemists
British chemists
Academics of the University of Bristol
1968 births
Living people
Alumni of the University of Cambridge